Sidney George Jerram (second ¼ 1891 – 1959) was a Welsh rugby union, and professional rugby league footballer who played in the 1910s and 1920s.

Background
Sid Jerram's birth was  registered in Swansea, Wales, and he died aged  in Swansea, Wales.

Playing career

Change of code
Following a meeting with a Wigan rugby league club representative at the Bush Hotel, Swansea on Sunday 28 September 1913, Swansea RFC's rugby union half-back pairing of Sidney Jerram, and George Owens were each signed for £180 down payment (based on increases in average earnings, this would be approximately £61,630 in 2013), guaranteed win bonuses, and jobs for £2 per week cash.

International honours
Jerram won caps for Wales (RL) while at Wigan in 1921 against England and Australia, in 1923 against England (two spells), and in 1925 against England (two spells), and won a cap for Other Nationalities (RL) while at Wigan in 1921 against England.

Notable tour matches
Sid Jerram played scrum-half in Swansea RFC's 3–0 victory over South Africa in the 1912–13 South Africa rugby union tour at St. Helen's Rugby and Cricket Ground, Swansea on Thursday 26 December 1912.

Championship final appearances
Sid Jerram played  in Wigan's 13–2 victory over Oldham in the Championship Final during the 1921–22 season at The Cliff, Broughton on Saturday 6 May 1922.

County League appearances
Sid Jerram played in Wigan's victories in the Lancashire County League during the 1920–21 season, 1922–23 season, 1923–24 season and 1925–26 season.

Challenge Cup Final appearances
Sid Jerram played , in Wigan's 21–4 victory over Oldham in the 1923–24 Challenge Cup Final during the 1923–24 season at Athletic Grounds, Rochdale on Saturday 12 April 1924.

County Cup Final appearances
Sid Jerram played , in Wigan's 20–2 victory over Leigh in the 1922–23 Lancashire County Cup Final during the 1922–23 season at The Willows, Salford on Saturday 25 November 1922.

Marriage
Sid Jerram's marriage to Edna G. (née Hughes) was registered during fourth ¼ 1915 in Swansea district.

References

 England & Wales, Birth/Death Indexes

External links
Statistics at wigan.rlfans.com
Swansea RFC : 1912–13 Season
Team – Past Players – J at swansearfc.co.uk
Profile at swansearfc.co.uk

1891 births
1959 deaths
Footballers who switched code
Liverpool City (rugby league) players
Other Nationalities rugby league team players
Rugby league five-eighths
Rugby league halfbacks
Rugby league players from Swansea
Rugby union players from Swansea
Rugby union scrum-halves
Swansea RFC players
Wales national rugby league team players
Welsh rugby league players
Welsh rugby union players
Wigan Warriors players